Aprosthema is a genus of insects belonging to the family Argidae.

The genus was first described by Konow in 1899.

Species:
 Aprosthema bifidum
 Aprosthema brevicorne
 Aprosthema fusicorne
 Aprosthema melanurum

References

Argidae
Sawfly genera